Chathrigalu Saar Chathrigalu is a 2013 Indian Kannada-language comedy film directed by S. Narayan. The final instalment in the Saar series, the film stars Ramesh Aravind, S. Narayan, Mohan, Umashree and Sanathahi.

Cast 
Ramesh Aravind as Ramesh aka Rammi
S. Narayan as Narayan aka Nani
Mohan as Mohan Sundar aka Moni
Umashree as Rajahmundry Rajalakshmi, Moni's Aunt
Sanathani as Lakshmi, Nani's Love Interest
Sushma Raj as Anjali, Rammi's Love Interest
Pavitra Gowda
Manasi as Kavya, Bhagavan's Daughter 
Shivaram as Bhagavan, Rajalakshmi's Husband and Moni's Uncle
Rangayana Raghu, Police Inspector - Bhagvan's Brother
Mukhyamantri Chandru Nani's Uncle 
Sadhu Kokila as Apparao, Rajalakshmi's Brother
Bullet Prakash as Bullet Bassu
Sundar Raj as Neelakanta, Lakshmi's Father and Rajalakshmi's Brother

Production 
The film reached the dubbing stage in February 2013.

Music

Release and reception 
Because Umashree was contesting at the Terdal Assembly constituency, the film was not released in that area.

A critic from The Times of India gave the film a rating of three out of five stars and opined that "A well-scripted comedy film. Don’t look for a serious story. Just watch and enjoy the comedy". B. S. Srivani of Deccan Herald gave the film the same rating and wrote that "“Chatrigalu...” still works, mainly because underneath all the sex-laced dialogues, there are still some gems to be found. It’s a laughing matter, after all".

References

External links 

Indian comedy films